The eastern puna mouse (Punomys kofordi) is a species of rodent in the family Cricetidae. It is endemic to southern Peru, where it is found in moist areas within puna grassland at elevations of 4500 to 4800 m in the Kallawaya mountain range, a section of the Cordillera Oriental.

References

Punomys
Mammals of Peru
Mammals described in 1995